Camilla Mollatt (born 17 November 1971) is a Norwegian politician for the Progress Party.

She served as a deputy representative to the Parliament of Norway from Akershus during the term 2013–2017. She hails from Oppegård.

References

1971 births
Living people
People from Oppegård
Deputy members of the Storting
Progress Party (Norway) politicians
Akershus politicians
Women members of the Storting